Pioneer Farm, also known as the McCurdy House, is a historic home located at Dansville in Livingston County, New York. It is a two-story brick residence built in 1822 by James McCurdy, son of Dansville's first settler.

It was listed on the National Register of Historic Places in 1970.

References

Houses on the National Register of Historic Places in New York (state)
Houses completed in 1822
Houses in Livingston County, New York
National Register of Historic Places in Livingston County, New York
1822 establishments in New York (state)